Sejong Science High School (SJSH) is a science high school (for ages 15–18) located in Guro-gu, Seoul, South Korea. It was founded in 2008 to develop and nurture the intellectual potential of Korea's most talented high school students in science and technology. Along with Hansung Science High School and Seoul Science High School, Sejong Science High School make up the three science high schools of Seoul.

History 

On November 3, 2005, the project about establishing new science high school in Seoul was approved by Ministry of Education and Science Technology. The name of the school, Sejong Science High School, is named after Sejong the Great, the king who created the Korean alphabet; Hangul. On March 24, 2009, the school officially signed in the friendship exchange with DDG-991 Aegis Combat System, generally called "Sejong the Great Combat System".

Educational Program with Local Residents as a target

Friendly Math Festival 
Friendly Math Festival, which was held in mid-July annually since 2008, is local science/math festival managed by Sejong Science High School. Local residents, public as well as students can participate in the festival. The main purpose of this festival is to enlighten and educate "science-apathetic, technology-apathetic public" with various activities, including exhibitions, workshops, live demonstrations of experiments and user created contents.
Although the name of the festival is Friendly "Math" Festival, participants can experience not only mathematical activities but science and technological events. Each booth provides  entertainment in different topic such as game theory, fractal, geometry, graph theory and sequence.

Scientific Development Class/Inventor Class 

Scientific Development Class/Inventor Class is an education project for all of middle school students in Seoul, including educationally disadvantaged student in local society, especially in Guro-gu. Since Guro-gu is educationally disadvantaged district compare to other part of Seoul, Sejong Science High School provide advantage to middle school students in Guro-gu when they apply to Scientific Development Class/Inventor Class.

See also
 List of Korean Science High Schools
 Gyeonggi Science High School
 Seoul Science High School

References

 Sejong Science High School website

External links 
 Sejong Science High School website (Korean)

High schools in South Korea
Science high schools in South Korea
Educational institutions established in 2008
2008 establishments in South Korea